Thomas Willis (1576–1656) was a member of the English landed gentry and Clerk of the Crown in Chancery at the outbreak of the English Civil War, owing to which he suffered the loss of his position and some of his estates. He appears in the 1619 update to the 1575 Visitation of Cambridgeshire, with reference made to his position and ownership of lands at Ashe, Hampshire.

Biography 
Thomas Willis was the son of Thomas Willis (or 'Willys') the elder, of Eyhall and Rouses Place in Cambridgeshire, and his wife Elizabeth, daughter of John Hasell of Dalemain, near Penrith.

In 1618, Willis purchased the manor of Ashe in Hampshire from its previous owner, Andrew Holdip.

On 2 March 1641, Willis the subject of this biography and his son Thomas were granted by Charles I the office of Clerk in Chancery, with reversion to his second son Valentine (then eight years old), the latter with power to act during his minority by deputy, to be appointed by his father. Willis was serving in this capacity when the English Civil War; he remained in London until August 1643, but was detained by royalist forces while visiting his estate in Hampshire and brought to Oxford, where he served the King until 1645. During this period, Parliament required the services of a Clerk in Chancery, and promoted Willis's deputy, John Bolles, to that status.

In 1645, following the King's defeat, Willis returned and submitted to Parliament, petitioning the House of Lords- and, upon the dissolution of that house on 19 March 1649, the House of Commons- for financial reimbursement of damages sustained to his estate by Parliamentary's forces, as well as funding for cancellation of debts resulting from this damage; he was required to take out mortgages, for which by this time he was liable to pay back, on his property at Ashe. The petition mentions that his annual fee as Clerk of the Crown was £66 13s. 4d.

In April 1654, the war having concluded in 1651, Willis tried to reclaim his position, but having been branded a delinquent by the Parliament, the office of Clerk in Chancery was granted to Nathaniel Taylor in 1655. Willis died the following year. By this time his son Thomas Willis had also died (on 2 March 1644), leaving his brother Valentine, to whom the office of Clerk in Chancery had been granted in reversion in 1641, to sue Taylor for possession of the position. After a protracted three-year dispute, Valentine Willis was admitted as Clerk of the Commonwealth in February 1660, and following the Restoration three months later, he was recognised as Clerk of the Crown.

Family 
Thomas Willis married Barbara Loker, the kinswoman and heir of Roger Loker; They had children:
 Thomas (16 February 1617 – 2 March 1644), who married Katherine, daughter of John Offley of Madeley. She subsequently married her first husband's cousin, William Willis; the Colonel of a Regiment of Horse (cavalry) under Charles I, his elder brothers, Thomas and Richard, were each created baronets of Fen Ditton.
Valentine (born 1633), became Clerk of the Commonwealth in February 1660, and Clerk of the Crown after the Restoration.

Notes

References 

1576 births
1656 deaths
English landowners
People from Overton, Hampshire